It's Not Over is the second album by American  singer Debelah Morgan. This album was released in Europe and Asia on VAZ/Motown September 15, 1998. First single "Yesterday" was given a U.S release giving Morgan urban success landing her song on the R&B charts. This album includes a duet by R&B super star Brian McKnight and a duet remake of the Motown classic "Ain't No Mountain High enough" with R&B singer Herschel Boone.
International single "I Love You" and remixes by Rodney Jerkins were the other highlights of this album. Two songs from the album were included on soundtracks for Fame L.A. and Our Friend, Martin.

Track listing

References

External links

1998 albums
Motown albums
Debelah Morgan albums